Derna is a port city in eastern Libya. It has a population of 85,000–90,000. It was the seat of one of the wealthiest provinces in the Barbary States, and remains the capital of the Derna District, with a much smaller area. Derna has a unique environment among Libyan cities, as it lies between green mountains, the Mediterranean Sea, and the desert. The city is also home to people of mixed origins.

The city was the location of the famous Battle of Derna (1805), the first victory achieved by the United States Military on foreign soil. Occurring during the First Barbary War, the battle was fought between a force of roughly 500 US Marines and Mediterranean mercenaries and 4,000 or 5,000 Barbary troops.

Parts of the city were taken over by Islamic State (IS) militants in October 2014. In June 2015, the Shura Council of Mujahideen in Derna defeated IS and took control of the town, before being expelled themselves by the Libyan National Army in the Battle of Derna (2018–2019).

Name
Darnis and Darne were the ancient Greek names for the city. While the form Dardanis is sometimes found, although this is erroneous. Under Rome the city was referred to as Darnis and Derna. Under Islam, it was known as Derneh (Derne, Dernah) or Terneh (Ternah).

History

Classic era and Middle Ages

In the Hellenistic period the ancient city of Darnis was part of the Libyan Pentapolis. Under Rome, it became a civil and later the religious metropolis of the province of Libya Secunda, or Libya Inferior, that is, the Marmarica region. The names of some of its metropolitan bishops are found in extant documents. Piso was one of the Eastern bishops who withdrew from the Council of Sardica and set up their own council at Philippopolis in 347. Early 5th-century Dioscorus is known because of a dispute he had with the bishop of Erythrum. Daniel took part in the Council of Ephesus in 431. In addition, John Moschus speaks of a bishop Thedodorus of Darnis as having had a vision of Saint Leo the Great in the mid-5th century.

No longer a residential bishopric, Darnis is today listed by the Catholic Church as a titular see.

The city was resettled by the Islamic refugees from Spain (Al-Andalus) in 1493 on the site of the ancient settlement.

Modern era

Ottoman times
Under Ottoman rule, Derna was initially under the governor at Tripoli, but shortly after 1711, it fell under the Karamanli sultanate until 1835, when it became a dependency of the autonomous sanjak of Benghazi, essentially Cyrenaica, which was governed directly from Constantinople. This in turn, in 1875, became the vilayet of Cyrenaica. In the 1850s, it had an estimated 4,500 inhabitants, who lived by agriculture, fishing and the coastal trade.

The oldest mosque in Derna is Al-masjeed al-ateeq, or the "Old Mosque", restored by wali Mahmoud Karamanli in 1772, vaulted with 42 small cupolas. This kind of vault was in use due to lack of some materials, like timber or stone in the region of Cyrenaica. There is another mosque, named Masjeed az-zawiyah, built in 1846, more strictly curved in the side of a hill.

The French admiral Gantheaume landed at Derna in June 1800 in an attempt to reinforce Napoleon in Egypt by bringing troops overland, but was rebuffed by the local garrison.

Italian occupation
On 16 October 1911, Italian troops occupied Derna during the Italo-Turkish War. The Italian rule over Derna lasted 29 years, 3 months, and 14 days until it was captured on 30 January 1941 by Australian Troops during the Second World War's North African Campaign On 6 April 1941, German forces retook the city from the British, and on 15 November 1942, British forces recaptured it.

Libyan Republic and civil war

In 2007, American troops in Iraq uncovered a list of foreign fighters for the Iraqi insurgency. Of the 112 Libyans on the list, 52 had come from Derna. Derna has the reputation of being the most fundamentalist Muslim city in Libya.

Following mass protests on 18 February 2011, the city came under the control of the National Transitional Council, breaking from the Libyan government. The city was never retaken before Gaddafi's ouster from Tripoli and the establishment of a new government. In October 2014, local militants affiliated with the Islamic Youth Shura Council publicly pledged allegiance to Abu Bakr al-Baghdadi, the leader of the Islamic State (IS). In November 2014, al-Baghdadi released an audio-recording accepting the pledge of allegiance and announced the expansion of his group.   In June 2015 Shura Council of Mujahideen in Derna defeated ISIL and took control over the town.   On June 28, 2018, forces loyal to Khalifa Haftar claimed to have taken full control of the city, following a two-year siege of the city that culminated in a month-long battle.

Geography

Derna is located at the eastern end of the Jebel Akhdar, one of the very few forested areas in Libya; due to its arid climate, forest makes up a mere 0.1% of Libya's land area. However, Derna is near the fertile upland area of eastern Libya, which is the wettest region in the country (600 mm).

Derna is linked with Shahhat by two roads; the inner one running through Al Qubah is part of the Libyan Coastal Highway and the coastal one running through Susa and Ras al Helal.

Climate
Derna features a hot semi-arid climate (Köppen BSh) with strong Mediterranean influences: essentially all the modest annual rains fall between October and March.

Summers are quite long and effectively rainless with afternoon temperatures averaging well above  between June and October.

Description
Derna has three main squares. The most popular square is the Maydan Assahabah. This square was always used for mass demonstrations against Libyan leader Muammar Gaddafi. The city is also a tourist hub due to its old city (the Medina), which is home to Islamic architecture. The Medina consists of a mosque, church, synagogue, many small streets, and old souqs. Derna's neighborhoods include Downtown (Wast Il Blaad), Al Ikweih, Al Mighar, Assahel Ashargi, Al Wadi, Bab Tobruq, Al Fitayih, and Bab Shaiha.

Main sights
There are many places of tourist interest, such as the Old Medina, Dark Souq, Sahaba Mosque, Attiq Mosque (42 Domes), Zuhair ibn Qa'is Mausoleum, al Kharraza, Souq al Farda and Khidra, Piazza Hamra, Piazza Derna, Maydan Al Sahhaba, Jewish Synagogue, Byzantine Church, Catholic Church, Ras Tin Beach, Piazza Attair, Ibrahim Istaa Omar, Derna Valley, Derna Waterfall, Finar Avenue, Zangat Al Bahr (Bahr Street), Omar Faiek Shennib Street, Zangat Al Hmar (Hmar Street).

Football
Derna is home to two main football clubs: Darnes and Al Afriqi.

See also
 List of cities in Libya

References

External links

 
Populated places in Derna District
Cyrenaica
Barbary Wars
Darnis
Baladiyat of Libya